Svyatoslav Kozlovskyi (born 26 March 1994 in Lviv Oblast, Ukraine) is a professional Ukrainian football striker who plays for Rukh Lviv in the Ukrainian Premier League.

Club career
Kozlovskyi is a product of youth team systems of FC Karpaty and FC Metalist.

International
He was called up for training process of the Ukraine national under-21 football team in January 2015.

References

External links
 
 

1994 births
Living people
Sportspeople from Lviv
Ukrainian footballers
FC Lviv players
FC Metalist Kharkiv players
FC Rukh Lviv players
CD Olímpic de Xàtiva footballers
Ukrainian Premier League players
Ukrainian First League players
Ukrainian Second League players
Association football forwards
Ukrainian expatriate footballers
Expatriate footballers in Spain
Ukrainian expatriate sportspeople in Spain